Texas's 19th congressional district of the United States House of Representatives includes the upper midwestern portion of the state of Texas. The district includes portions of the State from Lubbock to Abilene.  The current Representative from the 19th district is Republican Jodey Arrington.

History
The border runs along the western boundary with New Mexico, and runs along county borders to include far reaching cities. The area is predominantly rural, with the exceptions of Abilene and Lubbock, and includes many state parks, ranches, and farms.

This is one of the most conservative districts in Texas and the nation. It has not supported a Democratic presidential candidate since 1964. Republicans have held the seat since 1985. In the last three decades, a Democrat has only won 40 percent of the vote in this district twice, in 1984 and 2004.

Much of this region continued to elect conservative Democrats to local offices and the Texas Legislature until 1994. Since the mid-1990s, however, Republicans have dominated every level of government. There are virtually no elected Democrats left above the county level, and Republicans usually win most races by 70 percent or more of the vote.

The district voted 77% for George W. Bush in 2004 and 71% for John McCain in 2008.

Election results from presidential races

List of members representing the district

Election results

Historical district boundaries

See also
List of United States congressional districts

References

 Congressional Biographical Directory of the United States 1774–present

19